David McCann "Mac" Sweeney (born September 15, 1955) is a Republican former member of the United States House of Representatives from Texas.

Born in Wharton in Wharton County west of Houston, Sweeney earned his Bachelor of Arts and Juris Doctor from the University of Texas at Austin. In his early political years Sweeney served on the staffs of Republican Senator John G. Tower from 1977–1978, and former Governor John B. Connally, Jr., from 1979 to 1980, when Connally was seeking the 1980 Republican presidential nomination but finished with only one committed delegate.

Sweeney served as the director of administrative operations in the Ronald Reagan White House from 1981–1983. In this capacity, he worked directly with John F.W. Rogers and began a long-term association with another well-known Texan, James A. Baker III, then the White House Chief of Staff. In 1984, he unseated Democratic U.S. Representative William Neff "Bill" Patman in one of the nation's closest congressional elections. In doing so, Sweeney became the first-ever Republican to represent District 14.

In his campaign against Patman, Sweeney highlighted his time at the University of Texas Law School and claimed to had been published in the Texas Law Review. These were later proved to be untrue. In June 1986, a Sweeney staffer charged that she had told to work on his campaign or lose her job. Sweeney in reply said- "Most of what we are talking about here is junior staff indiscretions by a young staff." Ex-Congressman Patman said of Sweeney, "He's very flexible. I'd think he'd be a Chinese Communist if it would further his cause."

He was appointed to the House Armed Services Committee and became in 1985 one of six freshmen Republican congressmen from Texas infamously known as the Texas Six Pack, including future House Majority Leaders Dick Armey and Tom DeLay. Sweeney served two terms from 1985–1989 but was unseated in 1988 by Democrat Greg Laughlin. The prior, sprawling, 22-county District 14 has been divided, primarily by the 2003 Texas redistricting, into five different congressional districts today.

After his final unsuccessful campaign, Sweeney entered the private practice of law on Wall Street with the international firm Curtis, Mallet-Prevost, Colt & Mosle before later heading two businesses in New Jersey and Texas involved in successful restructurings or turnarounds.  In 1997 he began what became a seven-year commitment to humanitarian and missionary work, based out of Cairo but also working in over five different Arab countries. A large number of the 400-plus Christians, Muslims and Copts trained and funded by the Sweeney family continue to work today in Syria, Tunisia, Bahrain, Lebanon and Sudan primarily with schools, clinics, job training, micro-business and tent making enterprises.  

In 2004 Sweeney was considered for top positions at the Peace Corps and in helping to organize the first democratic Afghan presidential election, 2004 and the Afghan parliamentary election, 2005; but could not come to terms with the Bush Administration. As of 2011 he operates the Washington-based Paraclete Group which funds large infrastructure projects in developing nations that are typically paired with select in-country charities or international NGO groups. He serves on four non-profit or business boards, and he and his wife split time between Bethesda, Maryland and Houston. He has four children.

References

Sources

1955 births
Living people
University of Texas at Austin alumni
People from Wharton, Texas
Republican Party members of the United States House of Representatives from Texas
Reagan administration personnel
United States congressional aides